Stade de DUC Dakar is a multi-use stadium in Dakar, Senegal.  It is currently used mostly for football matches and serves as a home ground of Dakar UC of the Senegal Premier League. The stadium holds 2,000 spectators.

External links
Stadium information

DUC Dakar
Sport in Dakar